Tin Can Alley is a live album by Jack DeJohnette's Special Edition featuring Chico Freeman, John Purcell and Peter Warren recorded in 1980 and released on the ECM label in 1981.

Reception 
The Allmusic review by Scott Yanow states, "The wide-ranging music on this fine set ranges from African rhythms and colors reminiscent of Duke Ellington to some boppish moments and a bit of light funk. Although not the most powerful version of Special Edition, this set is recommended".

Track listing
All compositions by Jack DeJohnette except as indicated
 "Tin Can Alley" - 10:46
 "Pastel Rhapsody" - 13:29
 "Riff Raff" (Peter Warren) - 6:54
 "The Gri Gri Man" - 4:44
 "I Know" - 10:19
Recorded live at Tonstudio Bauer, Ludwigsburg, in September 1980

Personnel 
 Jack DeJohnette – drums, piano, organ, conga, timpani, vocal
 Chico Freeman – tenor saxophone, flute, bass clarinet
 John Purcell – baritone saxophone, alto saxophone, flute
 Peter Warren – bass, cello

References 

Jack DeJohnette albums
1981 albums
ECM Records albums
Albums produced by Manfred Eicher